The 2022 Qatar Cup, more widely known as the Crown Prince Cup, is the nineteenth edition of the Qatar Cup. It is played from February 9, 2023 – April 5, 2023. The cup is contested by the top four finishers of the 2021–22 Qatar Stars League.

Participants

Matches

Semi-finals

Finals

Bracket

References

Qatar Crown Prince Cup
Qatar Cup
Qatar Cup